These are the results for the 2005 edition of the Paris–Nice bicycle race, won by Bobby Julich.

Stages

06-03-2005: Issy-les-Moulineaux, 4 km. (ITT)

07-03-2005: Étampes – Chabris, 186 km.

08-03-2005: Aigueperse – Thiers, 46.5 km.

09-03-2005: Thiers – Craponne-sur-Arzon, 118 km.

10-03-2005: Saint-Péray – Montélimar, 101 km

11-03-2005: Rognes – Mont Faron, 172 km.

12-03-2005: La Crau – Cannes, 184 km.

13-03-2005: Nice, 135 km.

General Standings

Mountains Classification

Points Classification

Best Young Rider

Best Team

References

cyclingnews 63rd Paris-Nice - ProTour, France, March 6-13, 2005, Armstrong heads strong lineup for Paris-Nice 2005

2005
2005 UCI ProTour
2005 in French sport
March 2005 sports events in France